David Flynn may refer to:

 David Flynn (composer) (born 1977), Irish composer and musician
 David Flynn (chaplain) (died 1770), Irish Dominican
 David Flynn (Gaelic footballer) (born 1988), Gaelic footballer from Clonown in County Roscommon
 David Flynn (soccer) (born 1989), American soccer player
 David Flynn, co-founder of Fusion-io
 David Flynn, engineer designer of RISC architectures, co-recipient of the IEEE/RSE James Clerk Maxwell Medal with Dave Jaggar